Eppie Bleeker (born 5 May 1949) is a retired Dutch speedskater who won bronze medals at the World Sprint Championships in 1973 and 1974. He also won the national sprint titles in 1974 and 1975. 

Personal bests:
500 m – 38.70 (1977)
 1000 m – 1:19.34 (1974)
 1500 m – 2:04.59 (1974)
 3000 m – 4:34.30 (1975)
 5000 m – 8:01.90 (1974)

References

External links
 
 

1949 births
Living people
Dutch male speed skaters
Sportspeople from Friesland
People from Bolsward
World Sprint Speed Skating Championships medalists
20th-century Dutch people
21st-century Dutch people